Mount Forde is a mountain over  high, standing at the head of Hunt Glacier,  northwest of Mount Marston, in Victoria Land, Antarctica. It was mapped by the British Antarctic Expedition, 1910–13, and named for Petty Officer Robert Forde, Royal Navy, a member of the expedition's Western Geological Party.

References 

Mountains of Victoria Land
Scott Coast